Psexoanálisis is a 1968 Argentine film directed by Héctor Olivera.

Cast

External links
 

1968 films
Argentine comedy films
1960s Spanish-language films
Films directed by Héctor Olivera
1960s Argentine films